The Phil Donahue Show, also known as Donahue, is an American television talk show hosted by Phil Donahue that ran for 26 years on national television. Its run was preceded by three years of local broadcast on WLWD in Dayton, Ohio, and it was broadcast nationwide between 1970 and 1996.

History

Dayton start
In 1967, Phil Donahue left his positions as news reporter and interviewer at WHIO radio and television in Dayton to go into the stations' sales department.  He found he did not like it and took an on-air news position at another Dayton TV station, WLWD (now WDTN). 

The station’s weekday variety, music and chat program, The Johnny Gilbert Show, ended suddenly, when Gilbert left on short notice for a hosting job in New York City.  WLWD named Donahue to replace Gilbert, keeping the live format and studio audience. But Donahue decided to take the show in a new direction.  He focused on one guest or topic for the entire hour and invited the audience to ask questions.  On November 6, 1967, Donahue hosted his first guest, atheist Madalyn Murray O'Hair. Though he would later call her message of atheism "very important", he also stated she was rather unpleasant and that, off-camera, she mocked him for being Roman Catholic.On May 19, 1973, Donahue's guest was Dr. Cody Sweet who brought the subject of body language to the US nationally syndicate television audience for the first time.

National syndication
Initially, the program was shown only on four stations owned by the Crosley Broadcasting Corporation (which would later take the name of its parent Avco Company): Dayton, Cincinnati, Columbus, and Indianapolis. With the show's ratings success in those cities, on September 14, 1970, The Donahue Show entered nationwide syndication.  When the Avco Company divested their broadcasting properties in 1976, Multimedia Inc. assumed production and syndication of the program, which was now known as simply Donahue.  Donahue relocated the show's home base to Chicago in 1974, first using the studios of independent station WGN-TV on the city's north side. Multimedia ended its relationship with WGN in 1982, a move designed to protect syndication exclusivity in markets outside Chicago (WGN was expanding nationally via cable television at the time), and Donahue moved downtown to CBS-owned WBBM-TV.

In 1984, Donahue introduced many viewers to hip-hop culture, as a program featured breakdancing for the first time on national television, accompanied by a performance from the hip hop group UTFO. In 1985, Donahue left Chicago for New York City and began recording in Studio 8-G at 30 Rockefeller Plaza, the home of his New York affiliate WNBC-TV. Prior to the move, a month-long series of commercials heralded the move, and NBC's late-night talk host David Letterman would use portions of his national program counting down the days to Donahue's move with a huge calendar in his studio.

Fainting hoax
One of the most discussed incidents in Donahues history came on January 21, 1985, soon after the show moved to New York. On this day's program, seven members of the audience appeared to faint during the broadcast, which was seen live in New York. Donahue, fearing the fainting was caused by both anxiety at being on television and an overheated studio, eventually cleared the studio of audience members and then resumed the show. It turned out the fainting "spell" was cooked up by media hoaxer Alan Abel in what Abel said was a protest against what he termed as poor-quality television.

International success
Donahue was also broadcast in the United Kingdom on the ITV Night Time line up in the late 1980s and early '90s, where it became cult viewing. After its success, Donahue made several shows in Britain featuring some well-known celebrities from the country as guests, recorded mostly in London but notably one programme recorded in Manchester, which had several members of the cast from the American sitcom Cheers and the Manchester-based soap opera Coronation Street. Thames Television also broadcast a number of episodes during daytime for the London area only.

It was also broadcast in Australia, first on WIN-4 in Wollongong and then nationwide on the Seven Network.

End of an era
In 1992, Donahue celebrated the 25th anniversary of his long-running television  program with an NBC special produced at the Ed Sullivan Theater in New York, in which he was lauded by his talk-show peers. However, in many corners, he was seen as having been surpassed both by Oprah Winfrey, whose hugely successful national show was based in Donahue's former Chicago home base; and Sally Jessy Raphael, whose talk show was distributed by Donahue's syndicator, Multimedia.

The talk show field became increasingly saturated as the 1990s progressed. Many of these shows took an increasingly tabloid bent. Donahue shied away from this trend, continuing to take a "high-road" approach. These factors led to a marked decline in ratings. The show also lost support after Donahue expressed his feelings regarding the first Gulf War. Towards the end of summer 1995, New York's WNBC-TV ceased airing the show after airing it since 1977. Weeks later, ABC-owned KGO-TV in San Francisco also dropped Donahue after carrying it for several years and also WPVI in Philadelphia also dropped Donahue around the same time.

Donahue was also ousted from its Rockefeller Plaza home, and relocated to new studios in Manhattan. Donahue was unable to resurface on another station in the nation's largest and eighth-largest markets, and its ratings never recovered. Many other stations either began dropping Donahue or moving it to late-night and early morning time slots, causing a further loss of viewers.

After 29 years, (26 of which in syndication) and nearly 7,000 shows, the final episode aired on September 13, 1996.

Reception 
In 2002, Donahue was ranked 29th on TV Guide magazine's list of the 50 greatest television shows of all-time.

References

External links 
 

1967 American television series debuts
1996 American television series endings
First-run syndicated television programs in the United States
1970s American television series
1980s American television talk shows
1990s American television talk shows
Television series by Universal Television
Culture of Dayton, Ohio
Daytime Emmy Award for Outstanding Talk Show winners
Peabody Award-winning television programs